David Millar Duncan (21 November 1921 – 11 January 1991) was a Scottish international footballer who played in the successful East Fife post war team, when they enjoyed creditable league and cup success.

Duncan was capped three times for Scotland in 1948. The opposition was Belgium, Switzerland and France.

References

External links 

1921 births
1991 deaths
Footballers from Fife
Scottish footballers
Association football wingers
Raith Rovers F.C. players
Celtic F.C. players
East Fife F.C. players
Crewe Alexandra F.C. players
Brechin City F.C. players
Scottish Football League players
English Football League players
Scotland international footballers
Scottish Football League representative players
People from Markinch